VOO (/vuː/) is the commercial name of the Belgian cable company, created by the Economic Interest Group (EIG) of Brutélé GIE in (Brussels Region and Charleroi Region) and Association Liégeoise d'Electricité (A.L.E.- Télédis), currently owned by Nethys SA and Brutélé SCRL 

Then two companies together bought eight Walloon cable companies (Igeho, Inatel, Intermosane, Seditel, Simogel, Telelux, Interest-Interost et Ideatel), the EIG constitutes today the primary cable operator in Wallonia and a part in the Brussels Region.

It offers mobile telephony using the Telenet network. In November 2021, Orange Belgium is now chosen to take over the company, winning against Telenet. A board meeting of Enodia was held on December 14 to validate or reject the decision of the board of Nethys. Thereafter, it will take several months for Orange Belgium to obtain the approval of the Competition Council and the European Commission, which must announce its decision by December 6, 2022.

References

External links

Cable television companies
Belgian brands
Belgian companies established in 2006